Sarıbuğday can refer to:

 Sarıbuğday, Kovancılar
 Sarıbuğday, Merzifon
 Sarıbuğday, Silvan